Armas Kinnunen (7 February 1900 – 26 June 1964) was a Finnish middle-distance runner. He competed in the men's 1500 metres at the 1928 Summer Olympics.

References

1900 births
1964 deaths
Athletes (track and field) at the 1928 Summer Olympics
Finnish male middle-distance runners
Finnish male long-distance runners
Olympic athletes of Finland
Place of birth missing